Janieck van de Polder (born ), better known by his stage name Janieck Devy or just the mononym Janieck, is a Dutch singer-songwriter, musician and actor. He is best known for his portrayal of Pluk in the 2004 film Tow Truck Pluck and the single "Reality" by Lost Frequencies, in which he took the melody, guitar, vocals and lyrics into account.

Early life
Van de Polder was born on 24 June 1994 in Noordwijk, Netherlands. He learned to play the guitar while waiting for the film set and wrote melodies and lyrics for his friends band Lost Fox, as well as made his own songs. At the age of 14, he wrote his first song he ever recorded titled "A Better Man".

Career

Acting
Van de Polder began acting at the age of ten and his first starring role was a titular role in the 2004 movie Tow Truck Pluck. Afterwards, he appeared in the 2006 movie Crusade in Jeans as Pepin. His next role was Punkjongen in the 2009 movie My Queen Karo. He also played in television series like Van Speyk, Villa Neuzenroode and Grijpstra en de Gier, as well as in the music video of "Deep Blue Sea" by Twarres' Mirjam Timmer and Simple Minds' Jim Kerr.

Music

Van de Polder made his debut as a singer in 2012, where he sent demos of his songs to producers Rowin Schumm and Tjaart Venema of SBV Music Entertainment who wanted to make a track with him, and his official first release was the single "Six String Thing", which was released on December 17. Since then, he began using the stage name "Yannick Devy". In 2013, he released his second single titled "Inspire Me". In July 2014, he released his debut studio album titled Survival Guide, simultaneously with the single "Better Man". In 2015, he was featured in Lost Frequencies' single "Reality", which topped the charts in over ten countries for the Belgian DJ. That same year, he was featured in Sascha Braemer's single "Drifting" from his debut album No Home. His single "Don't Give Up on Us" was featured in the 2015 German comedy film Fack ju Göhte 2.

In February 2016, it was announced that van de Polder signed a deal with Spinnin' Records, with whom he released a single titled "Feel the Love", which was edited by Sam Feldt, on May 6. The single became a summer hit and charted in the Netherlands, Belgium and Sweden. Since then, he began using the mononym "Janieck". On 22 June 2016, to celebrate his birthday, he performed at Giel on NPO 3FM. Shortly afterwards, he and Radboud Miedema co-write "Madison" for Alle Farben's album Music Is My Best Friend. Dutch radio station 100% NL nominated van de Polder as "Breakthrough of the Year" and his single "Feel the Love" as "Hit of the Year".

On 20 January 2017 he released the single "Just Wanna Be with You" on Spinnin' Premium. The single was available as a free download on Spinnin' Records website until 3 February, after that date it was released on iTunes, Beatport and Spotify. On 7 April 2017 he released "Little Hollywood", a collaboration with Alle Farben. A remix pack for the song was released two months later featuring remixes from Krono and Aligee & Lovra.

In December 2017, Janieck released his single Does it Matter.

Awards and nominations

Discography

Studio albums

Singles

Charted singles

Non-charted singles

 2012: "Six String Thing" [SBV Music Entertainment]
 2013: "Inspire Me" [SBV Music Entertainment]
 2014: "Better Man" [SBV Music Entertainment]
 2015: "Reality" (Lost Frequencies featuring Janieck Devy) [The Bearded Man (Armada)]
 2015: "Drifting" (Sascha Braemer featuring Janieck Devy) [WhatIPlay Records]
 2015: "Don't Give Up On Us"
 2016: "Feel the Love" (Sam Feldt Edit) (as Janieck) [Spinnin' Records]
 2016: "Madison" (Alle Farben featuring Janieck) [Ultra]
 2017: "Just Wanna Be with You" (as Janieck) [Spinnin' Premium]
 2017: "Little Hollywood" (as Janieck, with Alle Farben) [Synesthesia Recordings]
 2018: "Maybe" (with BUNT.) [Spinnin' Records]
 2018: "To Rome" (with Deepend) [PIAS]
 2019: "Somebody New" [Spinnin' Records]
 2020: "How (Do I Love You) [Spinnin' Records]
 2021: "Northern Lights [Armada Music]
 2021: "Life" [Armada Music]

Filmography
Credits adapted from IMDb; sorted by year.
 Tow Truck Pluck (2004) - Pluk
 Crusade in Jeans (2006) - Pepin
 My Queen Karo (2009) - Punkjongen

Notes
 A  "Feel the Love" did not enter the Ultratop 50, but peaked on the Flemish Ultratip chart.
 B  "Feel the Love" did not enter the Ultratop 50, but peaked on the Walloon Ultratip chart.
 C  "Just Wanna Be with You" did not enter the Singles Top 100, but peaked at number 24 on the Tipparade chart.
 D  "Just Wanna Be with You" did not enter the Ultratop 50, but peaked at number 7 on the Flemish Dance Bubbling Under chart.
 E  "Just Wanna Be with You" did not enter the Ultratop 50, but peaked at number 18 on the Walloon Dance Bubbling Under chart.
 F  "Little Hollywood" did not enter the Ultratop 50, but peaked at number 19 on the Walloon Dance Bubbling Under chart.
 G  "You Don't Have to Like It" did not enter the Ultratop 50, but peaked at number 32 on the Flemish Ultratip chart.
 H  "Narcotic" did not enter the Ultratop 50, but peaked at number 11 on the Flemish Ultratip chart.
 I  "Narcotic" did not enter the Ultratop 50, but peaked at number 10 on the Walloon Ultratip chart.

References

External links

 
 
 

1994 births
Dutch dance musicians
Dutch male singer-songwriters
Dutch pop singers
English-language singers from the Netherlands
Dutch male child actors
Dutch male film actors
Dutch male television actors
Living people
People from Noordwijk
Spinnin' Records artists
21st-century Dutch male singers
21st-century Dutch singers
21st-century guitarists
21st-century Dutch male actors